Wells Cathedral is a Church of England cathedral in Wells, Somerset, England.

The first record of an organ dates from 1310, with a smaller organ, probably for the Lady Chapel, being installed in 1415. In 1620 a new organ, built by Thomas Dallam, was installed at a cost of £398 1s 5d, however this was destroyed by parliamentary soldiers in 1643 and another new organ was built in 1662,
which was enlarged in 1786,
and again in 1855.
In 1909–1910 a new organ was built by Harrison & Harrison with the best parts of old organ retained,
and this has been maintained by the same company since.

Organists

1416–1418 Walter Bagele (or Vageler)
1421–1422 Robert Cator
1428–1431 John Marshal
1437–1462 John Marchell
1461–1462 John Menyman (joint)
1461–1462 Richard Hygons (joint)
1497–1507 Richard Hygons
1507–1508 Richard Bramston
1508 John Clawsy (or Clavelleshay)
1514 William Mylwhard
1515–1531 Richard Bramston
1534–1538 John Smyth
1547–1554 Nicholas Prynne
1556–1557 John Marker
1558 Robert Awman
1559–1562 William Lyde
1563 Thomas Tanner
1568 Matthew Nailer
1587 John Clerk
1600 Thomas Hunt
1608 James Weare
1613–1614 Edmund Tucker
1614–1619 Richard Brown
1619–1642 John Oker (or Okeover)
1663–1674 John Brown
1674 Mr Hall
1674–1688 John Jackson
1688–1690 Robert Hodge
1690–1712 John George
1713–1726 William Broderip
1726 Joseph Millard
1727–1740 William Evans
1741 Jacob Nickells
1741–1771 John Broderip
1771–1773 Peter Parfitt
1773–1781 Robert Parry
1781–1820 Dodd Perkins
1820–1859 William Perkins
1859–1895 Charles Williams Lavington
1896–1899 Percy Carter Buck
1899–1933 Revd. Canon Thomas Henry Davis
1933–1936 Conrad William Eden
1936–1971 Denys Pouncey, with Peter Lyons (musician), who was Director of Music at Wells Cathedral School, as Master of the Choristers from 1954-1960.
1971–1996 Anthony Crossland
1996–2004 Malcolm Archer
2004–2005 Rupert Gough (acting)
2005–2019 Matthew Owens
2020–2022 Jeremy Cole (acting Organist and Master of the Choristers since 2019)

Assistant organists
 Charles William Lavington 1842 – 1859
 J. Summers
 Frederick Crowe (later organist of Chichester Cathedral) c.1880
 Charles Harry Moody 1894 – 1895 (then acting organist 1895)
 Frederick William Heck 1896 – 1897 (afterwards organist of Bedminster Parish Church)
 W. J. Bown
 Richard John Maddern-Williams 1904 – 1906 (afterwards sub-organist of Norwich Cathedral).
 Kenneth J Miller 1906
 F.P. Wheeldon 1908
 Frank W. Porkess
 Marmaduke Conway 1920 – 1925 (later organist of Ely Cathedral)
 C.H. Trevor 1926 – 1927
 Conrad William Eden 1927 – 1933 (then organist)
 J.W. Martindale-Sidwell 1938
 Michael Peterson 1946 – 1953
 Hugo Langrish 1953 - 1961
 Anthony Crossland 1961 – 1970
 David Anthony Cooper 1977 – 1983 (later organist of Blackburn Cathedral)
 Christopher Brayne 1983 – 1990 (later organist of Bristol Cathedral)
 David Ponsford
 Andrew Nethsingha 1990 – 1994
 Rupert Gough 1994 – 2005
 David Bednall 2002 – 2007 (Senior Organ Scholar 2002 – 2004)
 Jonathan Vaughn 2007 – 2017
 Jeremy Cole 2017-2019
 James Gough (Acting) 2019-2020

References

Bibliography

Wells Cathedral
Wells Cathedral
Organists